Joseph Florence Abbott (March 3, 1888November 17, 1961) was a lawyer, who served as President of the American Sugar Refining Company, then the largest sugar producer in the United States.  During World War I, he served as a lieutenant in the United States Army.

Early life and education 
Abbott was born on March 3, 1888, in Clarksville, Tennessee, to Florence and Elizabeth Abbott.  He graduated from St. Mary's College and then studied law at Georgetown University from 1907 to 1911.

Career 
Abbott was admitted to the bar in the District of Columbia in 1912.

During World War I, he served as a lieutenant in the field artillery in the United States Army.

After serving in the military during World War I, he returned to practice law.  He served as the General Counsel for the American Sugar Refining Company from 1926 to 1929.  He became its President in 1929 and served as such until 1953.

Personal life 
Abbott married Laura C. Griswold on June 5, 1920.  Together, they had 2 children: Charles Griswold Abbott and Joseph Alan Abbott.

Death and legacy 
Abbott died on November 17, 1961, and was buried in Putnam Cemetery, Greenwich, Connecticut.

References 

1888 births
1961 deaths
People from Clarksville, Tennessee
American food industry business executives
United States Army personnel of World War I
Tennessee lawyers
20th-century American lawyers
United States Army officers
St. Mary's College of Maryland alumni
Georgetown University Law Center alumni
Burials in Connecticut